Bassam Shakaa (1930 – 22 July 2019) was mayor of Nablus from 1976 to 1982.

Biography
Bassam Shakaa was a member of one of the  most distinguished families in Nablus. He became a member of the Jordanian regional branch of the Ba'ath Party in the early 1950s and as a consequence was wanted by Jordanian authorities, forcing him to flee to Syria. He was one of the fierce critics of Syria's independence from the United Arab Republic and after being jailed by the Syrian authorities following his resignation from the Ba'ath Party because of the 1966 split within the Ba'ath movement. Following his release, he moved to Egypt until amnesty from the Jordanian government when he moved back to his hometown of Nablus.

In 1976 he was elected mayor of Nablus, a position he held until 1982, when all Palestinian mayors were replaced with Israeli local governors. Shakaa had been a Palestine Liberation Organisation supporter and outspoken critic of the Camp David accords, and was subsequently issued an expulsion order in 1979. Felicia Langer successfully defended him from the charges in the court, which was accompanied by large-scale popular actions consisting of demonstrations and the collective resignation of all West Bank mayors.

On June 2, 1980, he was the victim of a bomb placed in his car by members of the Jewish Underground. They also planted bombs in the cars of Ibrahim Tawil, mayor of El-Bireh, and Karim Khalaf, mayor of Ramallah. Khalaf lost one leg, while Shakaa had to have both legs amputated. Moshe Zer, one of the first Israeli settlers in the northern West Bank, led the Jewish Underground "hit team" that tried to assassinate Shakaa. Zer was convicted of causing grievous injury and belonging to a terror group, but was sentenced to only four months in prison, the time he was in jail awaiting trial, because of the state of his health and the fact that he was badly injured in an attempt of a Palestinian to murder him. The bomb was planted merely months after Ezer Weizman, then Israeli defence minister, threatened Shakaa with "physical harm" if he carried on with his resistance.

In the spring of 1982, the Israeli administration removed Shakaa as mayor and installed an army officer who ran the city for the following three-and-a-half years. Following his mayorship, Shakaa remained a strong supporter of the Palestine Liberation Organization (PLO) and continued his resistance against Israeli governance under occupation. The Oslo Accords were a blow to the resistance Shakaa and his contemporaries put up against Israeli governance during their time in mayorship and he was as outspoken against Oslo and the Palestinian Authority (PA) as he was against the agreement reached at Camp David in 1978. He remained a supporter of resistance, both violent and non-violent, against Israeli occupation and maintained his anti-normalization position, opposing negotiations with the occupation. In 1999, the Palestinian Authority put him under house arrest following "The 20 Declaration", which was signed by 20 anti-PA figures, criticizing the line the PA was going down and calling for an end to the Oslo Accords. In September 2011, Shakaa signed a petition of several Palestinian figures criticizing PA president Mahmoud Abbas' move to seek recognition of a Palestinian state based on 1967 borders at the United Nations as a distraction from the resistance that the Palestinian people must carry out and a move that could put Palestinian rights in danger. Shakaa was President of the pan-Arabist Party in Palestine (al-Tayyar al-Arabi al-Qawmi fi Falasteen). Former Nablus mayor Ghassan Shakaa and former Dutch member of parliament Arjan El Fassed are his nephews.

Shakaa died on 22 July 2019 in Nablus, aged 89.

Further reading
Marion Woolfson: Bassam Shaka, portrait of a Palestinian. London: Third World Centre, 1981,

References

External links
"Two Teeth for a Tooth!". June 16, 1980. Time
Donald Neff: "Jewish Terrorists Try to Assassinate Three Palestinian Mayors" Washington Report on Middle East Affairs, June 1999, pages 87–88
"Palestinians arrested for criticicing self-rule authority" BBC 28 November 1999
"The Absence of National Unity: An Interview with Bassam Shaka" Arjan El Fassed, The Electronic Intifada, 29 August 2005
Bassam Shaka biography

1930 births
2019 deaths
Palestinian amputees
Mayors of Nablus
Members of the Jordanian Regional Branch of the Ba'ath Party
Palestinian Arab nationalists